William Thomas Birch (26 October 1849 – 18 August 1897) was an Australian cricketer. He played two first-class matches for Tasmania between 1868 and 1878. Birch had a long association with the Hobart City Council and was Town Clerk at the time of his death.

See also
 List of Tasmanian representative cricketers

References

External links
 

1849 births
1897 deaths
Australian cricketers
Tasmania cricketers
Cricketers from Hobart